Violin Sonata No. 27 in G major (K. 379/373a) was composed by Wolfgang Amadeus Mozart in Vienna in 1781 and first published in the same year.

Structure
This violin sonata consists of two movements.

Discography  
Oleg Kagan, violin and Sviatoslav Richter, piano: Violin Sonata in G, K. 379 (1982)
Arthur Grumiaux, violin and Walter Klien, piano: Violin Sonata in G K379 (1982)
Augustin Dumay, violin and Maria João Pires, piano: Violin sonatas K. 301, No. 18, K. 304, No. 21, K. 378, No. 26 and K. 379, No. 27 (1991)
, violin and Jos Van Immerseel, fortepiano: Violin Sonata in G, K. 379 (2000)
, violin and Amandine Savary, piano: Violin sonatas K. 376, No. 24, K. 379, No. 27 and K. 526, No. 35 (2019)

References

Further reading

External links 
 
 
 

379
1781 compositions
Compositions in G major